Hurricane Irene–Olivia  was the first actively tracked tropical cyclone to move into the eastern Pacific Ocean from the Atlantic basin. It originated as a tropical depression on September 11, 1971, in the tropical Atlantic. The cyclone tracked nearly due westward at a low latitude, passing through the southern Windward Islands and later over northern South America. In the southwest Caribbean Sea, it intensified to a tropical storm and later a hurricane. Irene made landfall on southeastern Nicaragua on September 19, and maintained its circulation as it crossed the low-lying terrain of the country. Olivia weakened significantly before moving ashore on the Baja California Peninsula on September 30; the next day it dissipated.

In the Atlantic, Irene produced moderate rainfall and winds along its path, although impact was greatest in Nicaragua where it moved ashore as a hurricane. A total of 96 homes were destroyed, and 1,200 people were left homeless. The rainfall resulted in widespread flooding, killing three people in Rivas. In neighboring Costa Rica, Hurricane Irene caused more than $1 million (USD) in damage to the banana crop. Later, the remnants of Hurricane Olivia produced rainfall in the southwest United States. Flooding was reported near Yuma, Arizona, which closed a major highway, and the moisture produced snowfall in higher elevations in the Rocky Mountains.

Meteorological history

The origins of the hurricane were from a tropical wave that exited the west African coast on September 7. It was one of seven active tropical cyclones in the Atlantic basin that day, one of the most active single days on record. It existed at a fairly low latitude and failed to intensify due to the unfavorable combination of Hurricane Ginger and a long trough to its northwest. On September 13, the depression passed just south of Barbados and subsequently entered the Caribbean Sea. Interacting with the terrain of South America, the center became broad and ill-defined, although Curaçao reported winds of near tropical storm force as it crossed the island on September 16. It later moved near or over northern Venezuela and Colombia. As it approached the western Caribbean, the depression was able to organize more, with less influence from landmass or the trough to its north. Initially, the storm was expected to track west-northwestward toward the northwest Caribbean, similar to the track taken by the destructive Hurricane Edith two weeks prior.

Tropical Storm Irene gradually intensified as it continued across the southwestern Caribbean Sea. Late on September 18, the storm attained hurricane status a short distance off the coast of Central America, with  winds, its peak intensity in the Atlantic Ocean. As it strengthened, it developed an eye and spiral rainbands that extended across Panama into the Pacific Ocean. Hurricane Irene weakened slightly as it approached the coast, although its pressure dropped to 989 mbar. On September 19, the hurricane made landfall in the Nicaraguan South Caribbean Coast Autonomous Region; it was the first tropical cyclone of hurricane intensity since 1911 to strike Nicaragua south of Bluefields. Irene quickly weakened, deteriorating to tropical depression status within 18 hours of moving ashore. The circulation remained organized over the low-lying terrain of southern Nicaragua, possibly due to it crossing Lake Nicaragua. After reaching the Pacific Ocean on September 20, the depression restrengthened to attain tropical storm status; upon doing so, it was re-designated by a new name, Olivia. It was the first time an Atlantic hurricane was tracked as a tropical cyclone while crossing Central America into the Pacific Ocean; subsequent research indicated there were earlier storms that accomplished the feat, although they were not known at the time.

As an Eastern Pacific tropical cyclone, Olivia maintained well-defined outflow and inflow. It gradually intensified as it paralleled the southern Central America coastline. For several days, Olivia moved west to west-northwestward off the coast of Mexico, although its exact intensity fluctuations were unknown, due to lack of significant observations. The Hurricane Hunters also reported a pressure of 948 mbar, which was the lowest reported pressure during the 1971 Pacific hurricane season.

The intensity of Hurricane Olivia fluctuated for two days as it turned westward away from land, due to a blocking ridge over northwestern Mexico. Subsequently, dry air became entrained in the circulation, and Olivia began to weaken as it moved over cooler waters. The eye became disorganized and eventually dissipated. Late on September 28 it weakened to tropical storm status, after beginning a turn to the northwest and later to the north. About 24 hours later, Olivia weakened to tropical depression status as it approached the coastline of the Baja California Peninsula. Most of the thunderstorm activity dissipated by the time the depression moved ashore on September 30; the next day, Olivia dissipated near the border of Baja California and Baja California Sur.

Impact and records

The system also dropped  of rainfall in Trinidad. Prior to its arrival, officials noted the potential for the depression to bring flash flooding to northern Venezuela, as well as heavy rainfall to the ABC islands. Later as a tropical storm, Irene brushed San Andrés island in the western Caribbean with gale-force winds; no major damage was reported there.

Prior to the hurricane's landfall in Nicaragua, the country's army evacuated about 500 people from a settlement near Bluefields, and along the coastline, boats were advised to remain at port. The winds destroyed 27 houses in the region. Observations were not available in the sparsely populated region near where Irene moved ashore, although winds were believed to have reached hurricane force there. Reconnaissance planes reported heavy structural and tree damage in southeastern Nicaragua. The rainfall caused flooding in many communities, killing three people in Rivas. At least five rivers reported flooding; along one of the rivers, 35 houses were inundated, and along another, the floodwaters swept away all of the crops and personal belongings of three villages. Across the country, the hurricane destroyed 96 homes, and 1,200 people were left homeless. In Costa Rica, Irene's passage resulted in more than $1 million (USD) in damage to the banana crop.

Late in its duration, Hurricane Olivia brought increased moisture into the southwest United States. Light precipitation was also reported in western Texas and southeastern California. The National Weather Service issued flash flood warnings throughout the region. Near Yuma, Arizona, thunderstorms caused three major power outages and produced flooding that resulted in the closure of a portion of U.S. Route 95. In Navajo and Pinal counties, the rainfall damaged roads, bridges, sewers, and homes, which amounted to about $250,000 in repair work for the state of Arizona. The storm's moisture also produced locally heavy snowfall in higher elevations in the Rocky Mountains.

Irene–Olivia is unusual in that it survived passage from the Atlantic to Pacific Ocean. Only nine other named storms are known to have done so. Irene was the first of four Atlantic-to-Pacific crossover tropical cyclones in the 1970s, three of four which took eastern Pacific names starting with the letter O.

See also

 Other tropical cyclones named Irene
 Other tropical cyclones named Olivia
 List of Atlantic–Pacific crossover hurricanes
 List of South America hurricanes
 List of Category 1 Atlantic hurricanes
 List of Category 3 Pacific hurricanes
 Hurricane Joan–Miriam (1988)
 Hurricane Bonnie (2022)

References

External links
 Atlantic to Pacific crossover storms

Irene-Olivia
Irene-Olivia
Irene-Olivia
Irene-Olivia
Irene-Olivia
Irene-Olivia
Irene-Olivia
Irene-Olivia
Irene-Olivia
Irene-Olivia
Irene-Olivia
1971 in Mexico
1971 natural disasters in the United States
Hurricanes in Costa Rica